Scott Rothkopf (born 1976 in Dallas) is an American art historian and curator. Rothkopf is currently the Senior Deputy Director and Nancy and Steve Crown Family Chief Curator at the Whitney Museum of American Art.

Career
A native of Dallas, Rothkopf graduated from the Greenhill School. He obtained both his Bachelor of Arts in Art History in 1999, under Yve-Alain Bois, and graduate degrees from Harvard University.

From 2004 until 2009, Rothkopf was a senior editor of Artforum. He then joined the Whitney Museum of American Art as a curator. In 2015, Rothkopf was promoted to the role of Nancy and Steve Crown Family Chief Curator, replacing Donna De Salvo, and three years later, jointly as the Senior Deputy Director.

While at the Whitney, Rothkopf has curated numerous exhibitions, including; "Mary Heilmann: Sunset" (2015), "Jeff Koons: A Retrospective" (2014 - the largest single artist exhibition in the Whitney's history and the closing show in the Museum's previous Marcel Breuer designed Madison Avenue home space), "Sinister Pop" (2012–13, with Donna De Salvo), "Wade Guyton OS" (2012–13), Glenn Ligon: AMERICA (2011), "Singular Visions" (2010, with Dana Miller) and "Whitney on Site: Guyton\Walker" (2010).

See also
List of Harvard University people
List of people from Dallas

References

External links
Whitney Museum of American Art profile

1976 births
Living people
Writers from Dallas
American art curators
American art writers
Harvard University alumni
People associated with the Whitney Museum of American Art